Ivanovka is a rural locality (a selo) and the administrative centre of Ivanovsky Selsoviet, Davlekanovsky District, Bashkortostan, Russia. The population was 749 as of 2010. There are 6 streets.

Geography 
Ivanovka is located 36 km northwest of Davlekanovo (the district's administrative centre) by road. Leninsky is the nearest rural locality.

References 

Rural localities in Davlekanovsky District